Jan Evangelista Purkyně University in Ústí nad Labem (abbreviated as UJEP) is a public university in Ústí nad Labem in the Czech Republic. The institution was established on 28 September 1991. It bears the name of famous Czech scientist Jan Evangelista Purkyně who was born in nearby Libochovice. More than 12,000 students are studying at the university. UJEP has around 900 employees.

History
Originally, in 1954, the pedagogical high school was established; in 1964 it changed to the Faculty of Education. With Act No. 314/1991 of the Czech National Council, the university was established. The formal inauguration ceremony was held on 28 September 1991.

This university consists of eight faculties of which the Faculty of Education, the Faculty of Social and Economic Studies, the Faculty of the Environment and the Institute of Slavonic and German Studies were the first parts of the university.

Location
The university is near the German border in Ústí nad Labem. It is in the centre of the city with its many faculties and halls of residence. The city cooperates with UJEP with aims to create a new university campus that will take the place of the former Masaryk Hospital.

Structure
The self-governing academic bodies of the University include:
 Academic Senate
 Rector
 Scientific Council
 Disciplinary Board
 Board of Trustees
 Bursar (University Bookshop, Economic Department, Administration of Residential Halls and Canteens)
 Faculties and Institutes

References

External links

Universities in the Czech Republic
Faculty of Social and Economic Studies
Faculty of Art and Design
Faculty of the Environment
Faculty of Education
Faculty of Science
Faculty of Philosophy
Faculty of Production Technology and Management
Faculty of Health Studies
Institute of Slavonic and Germanic Studies

 
Universities in the Czech Republic
Educational institutions established in 1991
1991 establishments in Czechoslovakia